Vítor Gonçalves (born 1951) is a Portuguese filmmaker.

Vítor Gonçalves may also refer to:

Vítor Gonçalves (footballer, born 1896)
Vítor Gonçalves (footballer, born 1944)
Vítor Gonçalves (footballer, born 1992)
Vítor Gonçalves (theatre director) (born 1963), Portuguese theatre director